Sunderland was a borough constituency of the House of Commons, created by the Reform Act 1832 for the 1832 general election. It elected two Members of Parliament (MPs) by the bloc vote system of election. It was split into the single-member seats of Sunderland North and Sunderland South for the 1950 general election.

Boundaries

1832-1918 
Under the Parliamentary Boundaries Act 1832, the contents of the borough were defined as the Parish of Sunderland and the several townships of Bishop Wearmouth, Bishop Wearmouth Panns, Monk Wearmouth, Monk Wearmouth Shore, and Southwick.

See map on Vision of Britain website.

Minor change in 1868 to include a small part of the Municipal Borough not in the Parliamentary Borough.

1918-1950 

 The County Borough of Sunderland
 The Urban District of Southwick-on-Wear.

Minor changes to align boundaries with those of local authorities.

Members of Parliament

Election results

Elections in the 1830s

 
 

Barrington resigned, causing a by-election.

Elections in the 1840s

 

Thompson resigned by accepting the office of Steward of the Chiltern Hundreds in order to contest a by-election at Westmorland, causing a by-election.

 

Grey succeeded to the peerage, becoming 3rd Earl Grey and causing a by-election.

 
 

 
 
 

Barclay resigned by accepting the office of Steward of the Chiltern Hundreds, causing a by-election.

Elections in the 1850s

 
 

Seymour was appointed Recorder of Newcastle upon Tyne, requiring a by-election.

Elections in the 1860s

 

Fenwick was appointed a Civil Lord of the Admiralty, requiring a by-election.

Elections in the 1870s

Elections in the 1880s

 

Allan resigned, causing a by-election.

Elections in the 1890s

Elections in the 1900s 

some records describe Wilkie as Liberal-Labour

Elections in the 1910s

stood as "Independent Tariff Reform" but was supported by local Conservative Association

General Election 1914–15:

Another General Election was required to take place before the end of 1915. The political parties had been making preparations for an election to take place and by the July 1914, the following candidates had been selected; 
Liberal: Hamar Greenwood
Labour: Frank Goldstone
Unionist:

Elections in the 1920s

Elections in the 1930s

Elections in the 1940s 
General Election 1939–40

Another General Election was required to take place before the end of 1940. The political parties had been making preparations for an election to take place and by the Autumn of 1939, the following candidates had been selected; 
Conservative: Samuel Storey
Liberal National: Stephen Furness
Labour: Fred Peart, Fred Willey

See also 

 History of parliamentary constituencies and boundaries in Durham

Notes and References 
Notes

References

Politics of the City of Sunderland
Parliamentary constituencies in County Durham (historic)
Parliamentary constituencies in Tyne and Wear (historic)
Constituencies of the Parliament of the United Kingdom established in 1832
Constituencies of the Parliament of the United Kingdom disestablished in 1950